On April 9, 1990, Atlantic Southeast Airlines Flight 2254, a scheduled passenger flight from Muscle Shoals, Alabama, to Gadsden, Alabama, to Atlanta, Georgia, was involved in a mid-air collision with a Cessna 172 over Gadsden. The collision resulted in the death of the pilot and passenger of the Cessna 172.

Aircraft
Atlantic Southeast Airlines Flight 2254 was operated under 14 CFR 135 with an Embraer EMB 120 Brasilia (registration ).

The second aircraft was a Cessna 172 (registration ), operated by two Civil Air Patrol pilots.

Accident
Flight 2254 departed Muscle Shoals, Alabama, en route to Atlanta with a scheduled intermediate stop at the Northeast Alabama Regional Airport in Gadsden, Alabama. The flight from Muscle Shoals to Gadsden was without incident.

Flight 2254 departed Gadsden from Runway 24, with Captain William Query (56) and an unnamed first officer at the controls. The aircraft turned left toward the east along its intended flight path to Atlanta, climbing toward an assigned altitude of 5,000 feet. The Cessna 172 was westbound at the same altitude, facing the setting sun.  The two aircraft collided at approximately 6:05 p.m. Central Daylight Time.

As a result of the head-on collision, Flight 2254's right horizontal stabilizer was torn from the aircraft. Though significantly damaged, Flight 2254 managed to return to the airport with no injuries to occupants. The Cessna 172 crashed into a field, resulting in fatal injuries to both occupants. The ASA crew reported afterward that they saw the Cessna moments before impact, and that the captain attempted evasive action by pushing the nose down, but was unable to avoid the collision. An eyewitness who saw the collision did not report any evasive maneuvers by either aircraft prior to the accident.

Probable cause
The probable cause of the crash was attributed by the NTSB to be "inadequate visual lookout by the pilots of both aircraft, which resulted in their failure to see and avoid oncoming traffic. A factor related to the accident was the sun's glare, which restricted the vision of the Cessna 172 pilot."

See also
Similar accidents between a scheduled commercial flight and a private aircraft in the immediate airport environment include:
1986 Cerritos mid-air collision
1978 San Diego mid-air collision
Golden West Airlines Flight 261
Piedmont Airlines Flight 22

References

Mid-air collisions
Mid-air collisions involving airliners
Mid-air collisions involving general aviation aircraft
Accidents and incidents involving the Embraer EMB 120 Brasilia
Airliner accidents and incidents in Alabama
Aviation accidents and incidents in Alabama
Aviation accidents and incidents in the United States in 1990
2254
Disasters in Alabama
Gadsden, Alabama
1990 in Alabama
April 1990 events in the United States